Anna Devor  is an Israeli-American biomedical engineer who is an associate professor at Boston University. Her research considers neuronal imaging and new strategies to better understand brain function. She is the editor of Neurophotonics, an SPIE journal.

Early life and education 
Devor was an undergraduate student in Israel. She moved to the Hebrew University of Jerusalem for doctoral studies, where she studied biophysical mechanisms of membrane potential oscillations in a network of coupled neurons. After earning her doctorate, she moved to the Massachusetts General Hospital to work as a postdoc in brain imaging technology.

Research and career 
Devor launched her own research laboratory at University of California, San Diego in 2005, where she has worked on technologies that enable the real time detection of brain activity. She combines these measurements with system-level analysis and functional magnetic resonance imaging. She created a brain-computer interface that had a flexible backing with penetrating microneedles, which can interface with the human brain and record signals from nearby neurons.

Devor has developed summer schools based on neuroimaging, microscopy and blood flow regulation. Devor is the editor-in-chief of Neurophotonics, an SPIE journal.

Awards and honors 
 The BRAIN Initiative awardee
 International Society for Magnetic Resonance in Medicine Outstanding Teacher Award
 Elected Fellow of the American Institute for Medical and Biological Engineering

Selected publications

References 

Living people
1972 births
Hebrew University of Jerusalem alumni
Boston University faculty
Biomedical engineers
Israeli women engineers
21st-century Israeli engineers
21st-century women engineers
Massachusetts General Hospital people
University of California, San Diego people
Fellows of the American Institute for Medical and Biological Engineering